A-H-S-T-W Community School District is a rural public school district headquartered in Avoca, Iowa.

It serves Avoca, Hancock, Shelby, Walnut, and much of Tennant. The initials of the five cities form the name of the school district.

History
It was formed by the merger of the A-H-S-T Community School District and the Walnut Community School District on July 1, 2016. About 88% of the voters in the combined area favored consolidation in the vote.

The initial school board was to be simply a combination of the existing A-H-S-T-W and Walnut districts, with a total of seven members: two from Walnut and the remainder from A-H-S-T-W. The prospective future board would have seven members, with two at-large and the remainder based on voting districts. The proportion was set since the former Walnut district had about one-fourth of the population of the combined A-H-S-T-W district.

Schools
The district operates three schools in a single facility in Avoca:
A-H-S-T-W Primary
A-H-S-T-W Intermediate
A-H-S-T-W High School

School expansion

Circa 2015, the middle school area of the A-H-S-T-W Secondary School building in Avoca was scheduled to receive an expansion.

A-H-S-T-W High School

Athletics
The Vikings compete in the Western Iowa Conference in the following sports:
Cross Country
Volleyball
Football
Basketball 
Golf
Soccer
Baseball
Softball

See also
List of school districts in Iowa
List of high schools in Iowa

References

External links
 AHSTW Community School District

School districts in Iowa
2016 establishments in Iowa
School districts established in 2016
Education in Cass County, Iowa
Education in Harrison County, Iowa
Education in Pottawattamie County, Iowa
Education in Shelby County, Iowa